The Main road 21 is a south–north direction First class main road in the road in the valley of a Zagyva river, that connects the M3 motorway's Hatvan junction to the, facilitating access from the capital city of Hatvan to Salgótarján-Somoskőújfalu. The road is 65 km long.

The road, as well as all other main roads in Hungary, is managed and maintained by Magyar Közút, state owned company.

Sources

See also

 Roads in Hungary
 Transport in Hungary

External links

 Hungarian Public Road Non-Profit Ltd. (Magyar Közút Nonprofit Zrt.)
 National Infrastructure Developer Ltd.

Main roads in Hungary
Heves County
Nógrád County